Dain Davis (born 20 January 1995) often known as DD is an Indian actor, comedian and television host, who works in Malayalam-language films and television shows. He won the talent hunt show Komady Circus (2016) telecasted by Mazhavil Manorama. He has hosted talent-hunt show Nayika Nayakan (2018) and Udan Panam 3.O (2020-22).

Early life and education 
Dain Davis was born in Ollur in Thrissur district of Kerala, India. His father is a hotel owner and worked in Kuwait, and his mother, Rosemol is a beautician. He has an elder brother. He graduated in visual communication from Divine Institute of Media Studies in Muringoor.

Career 
In 2016, Davis won the talent hunt reality show Komady Circus on Mazhavil Manorama. He is titled as best actor. He then went on to host Nayika Nayakan where he was given the nickname 'DD' by his co-anchor Pearle Maaney.

In 2017 he had his film debut in the Malayalam language horror film E, directed by  Kukku Surendran. In 2018 he had a part in the film Pretham 2, directed by Ranjith Sankar.

In 2019 he co-hosted Super Singer, a television music reality show on Surya TV with Ranjini Haridas.

From 2020 to 2022, he hosted Udan Panam 3.0 on the Mazhavil Manorama with Meenakshi Raveendran.

Filmography

Films

Television

Special appearances

References

External links 
 

Male actors in Malayalam cinema
Male actors from Thrissur
Male actors in Malayalam television
1995 births
Living people